Soar is a village in the  community of Aberffraw, Ynys Môn, Wales, which is 131.2 miles (211.1 km) from Cardiff and 216.3 miles (348.1 km) from London.

References

See also
List of localities in Wales by population

Villages in Anglesey